The Godfather book series is a series of crime novels about Italian-American Mafia families, most notably the fictional Corleone family, led by Don Vito Corleone and later his son Michael Corleone. The first novel, The Godfather, written by Mario Puzo, was released in 1969. It was adapted into a series of three feature films, which became one of the most acclaimed franchises in film history.

Puzo also wrote the second novel, The Sicilian, which was released in 1984, and was made into a film (with Godfather references removed) in 1987. Mark Winegardner wrote the next two novels, The Godfather Returns and The Godfather's Revenge, released in 2004 and 2006 respectively. Edward Falco wrote the fifth novel, based on a draft script by Mario Puzo, titled The Family Corleone, which also served as a prequel to Puzo's first novel. It was released in 2012.

Novel series

Chronology
 The Family Corleone (2012) – set from 1933 to 1934
 The Godfather (1969) – set from 1945 to 1955
 The Sicilian (1984) – set in 1950
 The Godfather Returns (2004) – set from 1955 to 1962
 The Godfather's Revenge (2006) – set from 1963 to 1964

Reception
By the time of its release, the first novel remained on The New York Times Best Seller list for 67 weeks and sold over nine million copies in two years since the release.

The series has sold 120 million copies.

Film adaptations

The Godfather

The Godfather trilogy is one of the most acclaimed franchises in film history. The Godfather, released in 1972, is an adaptation of the Puzo novel of the same name. The Godfather Part II, released in 1974, also adapts elements from the first novel - mostly the early life of Vito Corleone. The story of The Godfather Part III, released in 1990, is not taken from any novel. The Winegardner novels, released after Part III, incorporate and explain elements from Part II and Part III. Falco's novel, The Family Corleone, was based on an unproduced screenplay written by Puzo (intended for a fourth Godfather film, which was abandoned after Puzo's death).

The Sicilian

The 1987 film, The Sicilian, based on Puzo's second book (of the same name), features Christopher Lambert as the main character, Salvatore Giuliano. Due to copyright issues, all Godfather references were removed and the characters of Michael Corleone and Peter Clemenza were not included in the film.

Legal issues
By the time of the release of the fourth novel, The Godfather's Revenge, Paramount Pictures sued the Puzo estate for the publication of the novel, and also sought to block publication of The Family Corleone, claiming that it had only authorized publication of one sequel, The Godfather Returns. The lawsuit claimed that the novel tarnished the legacy of the films and misled readers into believing that the novels were authorized by Paramount.

With the release of the fifth novel, The Family Corleone, the estate of Puzo had sought to keep Paramount Pictures from producing a feature film based on the novel. This has been resolved, with Paramount gaining the rights to make more Godfather films (as of early 2020, no plans had been announced).

See also
 The Last Don
 Omertà (novel)
 Fools Die

References

External links
 Mario Puzo Official Website

Book series introduced in 1969
The Godfather novels
Novel series